China shares international land borders with 14 sovereign states. In addition, there is a  internal border with the special administrative region of Hong Kong, which was a British dependency before 1997, and a  internal border with Macau, a Portuguese territory until 1999.

Countries sharing land borders with China

The table below, is a table of countries and territories who share a land border with China around its perimeter. The in parenthesis are their lengths in miles.

See also
 Territorial changes of the People's Republic of China
 Territorial disputes of the People's Republic of China
 Chinese–Korean border fence
 McMahon Line
 Tumen River
 Boundaries of Hong Kong
 Frontier Closed Area
 Sino-Indian border dispute

References